The history of Briarcliff Manor, a village in Westchester County, New York, can be traced back to the founding of a settlement between the Hudson and Pocantico Rivers in the 19th century. The area now known as Briarcliff Manor had seen human occupation since at least the Archaic period, but significant growth in the settlements that are now incorporated into the village did not occur until the Industrial Revolution. The village has also grown in population; from 331 when established to 7,867 in the 2010 census.

Prehistory
 Archaic period: Around this time, the area of Scarborough-on-Hudson is first inhabited.
 Precolonial era: The area of present-day Briarcliff Manor is inhabited by a band of the Wappinger tribes of Native Americans known as Sint Sincks (or "Sing Sings").

17th century

18th century

19th century

20th century

 
 
 
 
 
 
 
 
 
 
 
 

 
 
 
 
 
 
 
 
 1914–18 (World War I): 91 Briarcliff Manor residents serve in the U.S. armed forces.
 
 
 
 
 

 
 
 
 
 1941–45 (World War II):  More than 340 of the village's 1,830 residents Briarcliff Manor residents serve in the U.S. armed forces.
 
 1950–53 (Korean War): Approximately 30 Briarcliff Manor residents serve in the U.S. armed forces.
 
 
 
 
 
 
 

 
 
 
 1965–72 (Vietnam War): At least five men serve in the U.S. armed forces, with four killed and another wounded.

21st century

See also
 History of Briarcliff Manor
 History of New York

Notes

References

Further reading

Published in the 20th century
  A 1939 publication on the history of Briarcliff Manor.
  A 1952 publication on the history of Briarcliff Manor.
  A 1977 publication on the history of Briarcliff Manor.
  A 1990 publication on the history of Briarcliff Manor.

Published in the 21st century
  A 2014 publication on buildings, places, and events in Briarcliff Manor.

External links

 Official website for the Briarcliff Manor-Scarborough Historical Society

Briarcliff Manor, New York
Briarcliff Manor
Briarcliff Manor